Prep is a short form of "preparedness" or preparation.

Prep may also refer to:

Education
 College-preparatory school or prep school, US, a type of secondary school
 Preppy or preppie or prep,  a US subculture associated with prep schools
 Preparatory school (United Kingdom) or prep school, a type of primary school
 Test preparation or test prep

Science
 PREP, gene encoding prolyl endopeptidase
 Pre-exposure prophylaxis (PrEP), disease-protective drug therapy

Other uses
 PREP Act or PREPA (Public Readiness and Emergency Preparedness Act), a US law that provides for immunity to liability for medicine manufacturers during a public-health emergency.
Prep, a novel by Curtis Sittenfeld
 P-rep, probability of replicating an effect
 PReP, the PowerPC Reference Platform

See also

Prep for Prep, a leadership program in the Bronx

 Prepper (disambiguation)
 Preppie (disambiguation)
 Prepare (disambiguation)
 Preparation (disambiguation)
 Preparedness (disambiguation)